Pterolophia koshikijimana is a species of beetle in the family Cerambycidae. It was described by Hiroshi Makihara in 2006.

References

koshikijimana
Beetles described in 2006